

Australian Capital Territory

Resorts:
Corin Forest

Snow country:
Bimberi Nature Reserve
Mount Franklin
Namadgi National Park

New South Wales

Resorts:
Charlotte Pass 
Perisher Blue 
Blue Cow
Guthega
Perisher Valley
Smiggin Holes 
Selwyn snowfields
Cabramurra (private ski tows)
Kiandra (abandoned mining town, birthplace of Australian skiing)
Thredbo

Snow country:
Kosciuszko National Park
The Main Range
Mount Jagungal

Tasmania

Resorts:
Ben Lomond
Mount Mawson

Snow country:
Ben Lomond National Park
Cradle Mountain-Lake St Clair National Park
Mount Field National Park

Victoria

Resorts:
Falls Creek  
Lake Mountain
Mount Baw Baw 
Mount Buffalo 
Mount Buller 
Mount Hotham
Dinner Plain
Mount St Gwinear
Mount Stirling
Tanjil Bren Accommodation

Snow country:
Alpine National Park
Bogong High Plains
Mount Bogong
Mount Feathertop
Baw Baw National Park
Mount Buffalo National Park
Mount Donna Buang
Mount Torbreck

See also

List of ski areas and resorts in Oceania

References

External links
Australian ski lift directory; details of Australia's  400 ski lifts

Australia
Lists of tourist attractions in Australia